L'entraînement du champion avant la course is a 1991 French drama film directed by Bernard Favre. It was screened in the Un Certain Regard section at the 1991 Cannes Film Festival.

Cast
 Richard Berry - Fabrice
 Valérie Mairesse - Loren
 Mireille Perrier - Liliane
 Jef Odet Sarfaty - Mouloud
 Daniel Milgram - The clerk
 Yvon Back - The neighbor
 Daniel Schenmetzler - The boss
 Raymonde Heudeline - MRS Zablinsky
 Françoise Miquelis - The client
 Hélène Phillipe - The client
 Sylvie Jobert - The wise woman
 Olivier Caillabet
 Pierre-Alain de Garrigues
 Julia Maraval - The elder girl
 Marguerite Mousset - The youngest girl

References

External links

1991 films
1990s French-language films
1991 drama films
French drama films
1990s French films